East Garden may refer to:

 A former name of the Jacqueline Kennedy Garden at the White House in Washington, D.C., United States, originally known as the Colonial Garden
 The eastern section of Yu Garden's Inner Garden in Shanghai, China, originally known as the Ling Yuan